Nassian Department is a department of Bounkani Region in Zanzan District, Ivory Coast. In 2021, its population was 71,724 and its seat is the settlement of Nassian. The sub-prefectures of the department are Bogofa, Kakpin, Koutouba, Nassian, and Sominassé.

History
Nassian Department was created in 2005 as a second-level subdivision via a split-off from Bouna Department. At its creation, it was part of Zanzan Region.

In 2011, districts were introduced as new first-level subdivisions of Ivory Coast. At the same time, regions were reorganised and became second-level subdivisions and all departments were converted into third-level subdivisions. At this time, Nassian Department became part of Bounkani Region in Zanzan District.

In 2014, the population of the sub-prefecture of Nassian was 19,971.

Villages
The seventeen villages of the sub-prefecture of Nassian and their population in 2014 are:

Notes

Departments of Bounkani
2005 establishments in Ivory Coast
States and territories established in 2005